Mazraeh-ye Garayili may refer to:
 Mazraeh-ye Garayili (1)
 Mazraeh-ye Garayili (2)